Abajyan or Abajian (Armenian: Աբաջյան) is an Armenian surname. Notable people with the surname include:

Gevorg Abajian (1920–2002), Armenian theatrical and literary critic
Robert Abajian (1932–1995), American fashion designer
Robert Abajyan (1996–2016), Armenian junior sergeant

Armenian-language surnames